Grete Ortved Frederiksen (later Therkildsen, born January 12, 1918, date of death unknown) was a Danish freestyle swimmer who competed in the 1936 Summer Olympics. She was born in Copenhagen. In 1936 she finished seventh in the 400 metre freestyle event.

See also
 World record progression 1500 metres freestyle

References

1918 births
Year of death missing
Olympic swimmers of Denmark
Swimmers at the 1936 Summer Olympics
Danish female freestyle swimmers
Swimmers from Copenhagen